Sangivamycin is a natural product originally isolated from Streptomyces rimosus, which is a nucleoside analogue. It acts as an inhibitor of protein kinase C. It has antibiotic, antiviral and anti-cancer properties and has been investigated for various medical applications, though never approved for clinical use itself. However, a number of related derivatives continue to be researched.

Oyagen, a biotechnology company, has been developing sangivamycin or OYA1, which showed efficacy against Ebola infections, as a broad spectrum antiviral for COVID-19. Tonix Pharmaceuticals licensed OYA1 from Oyagen in April 2021 to develop it for the treatment of COVID-19 and it is now called TNX-3500.

See also 
 CMX521 (methylated analogue)
 GS-441524
 NITD008
 Pyrazofurin

References 

Antiviral drugs